Aristolochia ceropegioides, synonym Pararistolochia ceropegioides, is a plant species of  family Aristolochiaceae. It is found in Cameroon and Gabon. Its natural habitats are subtropical or tropical dry forests and subtropical or tropical moist lowland forests. It is threatened by habitat loss.

References

ceropegioides
Vulnerable plants
Flora of Cameroon
Flora of Gabon
Taxonomy articles created by Polbot